Susan K. Falatko is an American diplomat who served as U.S. Chargé d’Affaires ad interim to Slovenia between January 20, 2021, and February 17, 2022.

Early life and education 
Falatko graduated from the University of Iowa in 1990 with a Bachelor of Science in psychology, and in 1997, a Master of Science in international relations from George Washington University. She is fluent in English, French and Spanish.

Career 
Falatko has a lengthy career serving in numerous positions in the Department of State. Originally, she served as an economic advisor in Bamako between 1999 and 2001, Havana between 2001 and 2003, and Sarajevo between 2006 and 2009. Falatko later served as Deputy head of mission at the United States Embassy in Mauritius and Seychelles between 2013 and 2016, and then served another role in 2017 at the Western Balkans.

On January 20, 2021, Falatko became the U.S. Chargé d’Affaires ad interim to Slovenia after the inauguration of Joe BIden, succeeding Lynda Blanchard. She would remain in this position until February 17, 2022, after Jamie L. Harpootlian presented her credentials.

Prior to joining the United States Department of State, she taught English in Tokyo, Bangkok, Prague, and Washington.

References 

Living people
American women ambassadors
University of Iowa alumni
George Washington University alumni
Ambassadors of the United States to Slovenia
21st-century American diplomats
21st-century American women
Year of birth missing (living people)